Kentucky Township is a township in Jefferson County, Kansas, USA.  As of the 2000 census, its population was 1,576.

Geography
Kentucky Township covers an area of 41.56 square miles (107.63 square kilometers); of this, 5.48 square miles (14.18 square kilometers) or 13.17 percent is water. The streams of Delaware River, Little Wild Horse Creek and Slough Creek run through this township.

Cities and towns
 Perry

Unincorporated towns
 Medina
 Newman
 Thompsonville
(This list is based on USGS data and may include former settlements.)

Adjacent townships
 Fairview Township (north)
 Oskaloosa Township (northeast)
 Rural Township (east)
 Lecompton Township, Douglas County (south)
 Kaw Township (west)

Cemeteries
The township contains three cemeteries: Mount Calvary, Newman and Perry.

Major highways
 U.S. Route 24

References
 U.S. Board on Geographic Names (GNIS)
 United States Census Bureau cartographic boundary files

External links
 US-Counties.com
 City-Data.com

Townships in Jefferson County, Kansas
Townships in Kansas